Ted Howard (born 1950, Ohio) is a social entrepreneur and author. He is the founder and Executive Director of The Democracy Collaborative and served as the Minter Senior Fellow for Social Justice with the Cleveland Foundation from 2010-2014. For more than 30 years, Howard has worked for non-profit organizations including UN agencies and The Hunger Project.

Since 2001, Howard has served as chairman of the board of Search for Common Ground, a conflict resolution NGO. He is chairman of the board of ocean advocacy group Blue Frontier Campaign, and a board member of LIFT, a national anti-poverty organization. In the early 1970s, he co-directed The People's Bicentennial Commission with Jeremy Rifkin, and in 1977 the pair co-founded the Foundation of Economic Trends.

Evergreen Cooperatives

Howard is the architect of the green jobs and wealth building program in Cleveland, Ohio, known as the Evergreen Cooperatives, based in part on the Mondragon Cooperatives in the Basque Region of Spain. Characterized in press accounts as "The Cleveland Model," Evergreen is an effort to create green jobs in low-income neighborhoods using the purchasing power of the City's anchor institutions (hospitals, universities, etc.) to create local worker cooperative businesses. The program has received international attention from media outlets including The Economist, Al Jazeera, BusinessWeek, and Time.

Published works

Howard has co-authored several books with economist Jeremy Rifkin, including Entropy: A New World View, Voices of the American Revolution, and Who Should Play God?. While at The Hunger Project, he and Dana Meadows et al. co-wrote Ending Hunger: An Idea Whose Time has Come.

He and the Democracy Collaborative's research director Steve Dubb have collaborated on a number of articles with political economist Gar Alperovitz, most recently "The Cleveland Model," which appeared in The Nation, and "Cleveland's Worker-Owned Boom" in Yes Magazine.  Howard is also the co-author of the Democracy Collaborative reports The Anchor Dashboard: Aligning Institutional Practice to Meet Low-Income Community Needs and
The Anchor Mission: Leveraging the Power of Anchor Institutions to Build Community Wealth.

Public speaking

Howard has given speeches at conferences and to groups including the Council on Foundations, the Federal Reserve Bank of Cleveland Seminar on Green Recovery, the 2010 Microenterprise National Conference, Clinton Global Initiative-America, the Initiative for a Competitive Inner City, the National Community Reinvestment Coalition, the Co-operatives United World Conference (Manchester, England), various regional Federal Reserve Banks, as well as at universities including the University of Pennsylvania, Yale, MIT, Georgetown, Oberlin, Michigan State and the Ohio State University.

Awards

In 2010, Utne Reader magazine named Howard as one of the "25 Visionaries Who Are Changing Your World" for his foundation of the Democracy Collaborative. He was named an Innovative Idea Champion in 2010 by CFED.

References

External links
 Political science books citing Ted Howard. Retrieved from Google Books, April 14, 2010.
 "Keynote: Anchor Man" by Marc Steiner. Urbanite Baltimore No. 70, Retrieved April 13, 2010
 Evergreen Cooperatives
 essential talks (docs) for cultural change, Accessed August 26, 2010
 Permaculture TV – "Place-Based Strategy for Worker Cooperative Development" Accessed August 26, 2010

Living people
1950 births
American non-fiction writers